The York Regional Police Services Board is the civilian oversight of the York Regional Police in the York Region of Ontario, Canada.

The board consists of a chair and members of regional council and the public. Regional members are appointees from York region and provincial appointments are members of the public from York. All members must be residents of York.

Current board

 Danny Wheeler - Chair and York Regional Councillor - Georgina
 Joe Persechini - Vice-Chair and provincial appointee - Newmarket
 Bill Fisch - York Region Chair and regional appointee - Markham
 Frank Scarpitti - Mayor of Markham and Regional appointee - Markham
 Barbara Bartlett - Regional appointee - Newmarket
 Sam Herzog - provincial appointee - Vaughan
 Joanna Yu - provincial appointee

Former members

 Tony Wong
 Margaret Black - former Chair
 Dave Barrow - former Chair
 Barbara Munro
 Asad M. Malik
 Daisy Wai

External links
 YRP Service Board

Civilian regulating boards